Andrew Jackson Caldwell (July 22, 1837 – November 22, 1906) was a U.S. Representative from Tennessee.

Biography
Andrew Jackson Caldwell was born in Montevallo, Alabama on July 22, 1837.  He moved with his parents to Tennessee in 1844, settling near Nashville.  He graduated from Franklin College, Tennessee, in 1854, and worked as a teacher in Nashville from 1854 to 1857.  He then moved to Trenton to study law.

Career
During the Civil War, Caldwell served in the Confederate States Army as a private and regimental quartermaster in the First Regiment, Tennessee Cavalry.  After the war, he resumed his law studies and was admitted to the Tennessee bar in 1867.  He returned to Nashville, to open a practice in law.  He became attorney general for the district of Davidson and Rutherford Counties, Tennessee, serving in this capacity from 1870 to 1878.  He also served as a member of the Tennessee House of Representatives in 1880 and 1882.

Caldwell was elected as a Democrat to the Forty-eighth and Forty-ninth Congresses (March 4, 1883March 3, 1887).   He was not a candidate for reelection to the Fiftieth Congress, and resumed the practice of law.

Death
Andrew Jackson Caldwell died in Nashville on November 22, 1906, (age 69 years, 123 days), and is interred at Mount Olivet Cemetery.

References

External links
 Retrieved on 2009-03-02

1837 births
1906 deaths
People from Montevallo, Alabama
Confederate States Army officers
Tennessee lawyers
People of Tennessee in the American Civil War
Democratic Party members of the Tennessee House of Representatives
Democratic Party members of the United States House of Representatives from Tennessee
19th-century American politicians